City of Lions is an American independent rock band from Newport Beach, California. Formed in 2011, the band consisted of lead singer Chad Nathaniel, back up singer and synthesist, Caitlyn Smith bassist Austin Buccowich, keyboardist Timothy Walton, guitarist Alan Moncada, drummer Michael Oliveira, and back up singer and synthesist Jay Lee. Chad also played ukulele and percussion in the band.

City of Lions started out in early 2011 releasing the music video for their song "You All Along".

City of Lions released their self-titled album in June 2012.

June 23, 2014, Ellie Goulding gave City of Lions the NEXT HYPE title during her hosting of BBC1 radio while Zane Lowe was on holiday. Goulding went on to say she uses City of Lions hit track Here Is Love to get pumped up before every one of her shows. 
https://www.bbc.co.uk/programmes/b0476p4f

July 2015 Chad Nathaniel Smith took a hiatus and established Himself as a Music producer and multi media artist.

Discography

Album
City of Lions (2012) – (Released on June 1, 2012 by City of Lions)

EP
Kings of Tomorrow (2015) – (Released on March 17, 2015 by Civil Defense Music)

Single
Where I Am (2020) – (Released on April 1, 2020 by City of Lions)

Single
Gasoline (2020) – (Released on April 6, 2020 by City of Lions)

Track listing

"Here Is Love" (2012) – (from the album City of Lions)
"You All Along" (2012) – (from the album City of Lions)
"We Will Cary On" (2012) – (from the album City of Lions)
"The Stray" (2012) – (from the album City of Lions)
"What Will It Take" (2012) – (from the album City of Lions)
"Unsung Villain" (2012) – (from the album City of Lions)
"If We Fall" (2012) – (from the album City of Lions)
"Shining Star" (2012) – (from the album City of Lions)
"Let You Go" (2012) – (from the album City of Lions)
"Love Come Find Me" (2013) – (Non-album single)
"Wrecking Ball" (2013) – (Non-album single and cover version of the Miley Cyrus song)
"Kings of Tomorrow" (2015) – (from the EP Kings of Tomorrow)
"Something More" (2015) – (from the EP Kings of Tomorrow)
"Where I Am" (2020) – (Non-album single)
"Gasoline" (2020) – (Non-album single)
"Tomorrow's Too Late" (2021) – (Non-album single)

Band members

Current members
Chad Nathaniel Smith

Past members
 Chad Nathaniel Smith – lead vocals, ukulele, percussion
 Austin Buccowich – bass guitar
 Timothy Walton – keyboards
 Alan Moncada – guitars
 Hans Van Treek - guitars
 Michael Oliveira – drums
 Caitlyn Smith – backing vocals, synthesizers

External links
"Music 2 Rise"

Musical groups from Orange County, California
Musical groups established in 2011
Rock music groups from California
2011 establishments in California